Princess Augusta of Bavaria, Duchess of Leuchtenberg (Strasbourg, 21 June 1788 – Munich, 13 May 1851) was the second child and eldest daughter of Maximilian I Joseph of Bavaria and Princess Augusta Wilhelmina of Hesse-Darmstadt. By marriage, she was a French princess.

Early life 

Augusta Amalia of Bavaria was the eldest daughter of Maximilian I Joseph of Bavaria and Princess Augusta Wilhelmina of Hesse-Darmstadt. In 1795, upon the death of her uncle, her father Maximilian became the reigning duke of Zweibrücken, but the troops of the young First French Republic occupied his States. Augusta lost her mother to tuberculosis in 1796; a year later, her father married the young Caroline of Baden, who imposed a seriousness on her husband’s court that some considered beneficial. At first, Augusta did not like her stepmother, unlike her younger siblings Karl Theodore and Charlotte, as she was still attached to her late mother; however, Augusta and Caroline’s relationship improved over time. In 1799, upon the death of his distant cousin Charles Theodore, Maximilian became count-elector, Palatine of the Rhine and Duke-Elector of Bavaria as Maximilian III.

Marriage and issue 
Although promised in marriage to the heir of Baden, Charles,  originally, the engagement was broken at the behest of Napoleon I of France. On 14 January 1806 in Munich, Augusta married Eugène de Beauharnais, the only son of Josephine de Beauharnais and Alexandre, vicomte de Beauharnais and stepson of Napoleon. In return, Napoleon raised Bavaria from a state to a Kingdom. Although a diplomatic marriage, this union would turn out to be a happy one. In 1817, Augusta's father named his son-in-law Duke of Leuchtenberg and Prince of Eichstädt, with the style Royal Highness.

Augusta and Eugène had seven children:
 Princess Joséphine Maximiliane Eugénie Napoléonne de Beauharnais (1807–1876); married Oscar I of Sweden, himself the son of Napoleon's old love, Désirée Clary.
 Princess Eugénie Hortense Auguste de Beauharnais (1808–1847); married Friedrich, Prince of Hohenzollern-Hechingen.
 Prince Auguste Charles Eugène Napoléon de Beauharnais, 2nd Duke of Leuchtenberg (1810–1835); married Maria II of Portugal. There was no issue from this marriage.
Princess Amélie Auguste Eugénie Napoléone de Beauharnais (31 July 1812 – 26 January 1873); married Pedro I of Brazil (father of Maria II of Portugal and Pedro II of Brazil) and became Empress of Brazil.
 Princess Theodelinde Louise Eugénie Auguste Napoléone de Beauharnais (1814–1857); married Wilhelm, 1st Duke of Urach.
 Princess Carolina Clotilde de Beauharnais (1816)
 Prince Maximilian Josèphe Eugène Auguste Napoléon de Beauharnais (1817–1852); married Grand Duchess Maria Nikolaievna of Russia, eldest daughter of Nicholas I of Russia and received the title of "Prince Romanovsky" with the style "Imperial Highness" in 1852.

Death 
Augusta had outlived her husband and three of her children by the time she died in 1851 at the age of 63 in Munich. At that time, France's president was her nephew Louis-Napoléon Bonaparte, the son of Hortense de Beauharnais, Queen of Holland, the sister of Prince Eugène.

Gallery

Honours
 : Dame Grand Cross of the Order of Saint Isabel, 1 December 1834

Ancestry

References

External links 

|-

1788 births
1851 deaths
House of Wittelsbach
Bavarian princesses
Beauharnais
Dames of the Order of Saint Isabel
Duchesses of Leuchtenberg
Burials at St. Michael's Church, Munich
Daughters of kings